Gran Paradiso may refer to:
 Gran Paradiso, a mountain group between the Aosta Valley and Piedmont regions of north-west Italy
 Gran Paradiso National Park, Italy's oldest national park
 Gran Paradiso (album), a 2016 album by Waldeck
 Gran Paradiso (film), a 2000 German adventure film

See also
 Paradiso (disambiguation)